Myotubularin related protein 12 is a protein that in humans is encoded by the MTMR12 gene.

Function

Phosphatidylinositide 3-kinase-derived membrane-anchored phosphatidylinositides, such as phosphatidylinositol 3-phosphate (PtdIns(3)P), regulate diverse cellular processes. The protein encoded by this gene functions as an adaptor subunit in a complex with an active PtdIns(3)P 3-phosphatase. Alternatively spliced transcript variants encoding different isoforms have been found for this gene.

References

Further reading